Sympterichthys is a genus in the handfish family Brachionichthyidae with these species:

Species
 Sympterichthys moultoni Last & Gledhill, 2009 (Moulton's handfish)
 Sympterichthys unipennis (G. Cuvier, 1817) (Smooth handfish) (likely extinct)

References 

Brachionichthyidae
Marine fish genera
 
Taxa named by Theodore Gill